Jack Angus (12 March 1909 – 1965) was a footballer who played in the Football League for Exeter City. He spent all his professional career at Exeter becoming a one-club man.

References

1909 births
1965 deaths
People from Amble
Footballers from Northumberland
English footballers
Association football defenders
Wath Athletic F.C. players
Wolverhampton Wanderers F.C. players
Scunthorpe United F.C. players
Exeter City F.C. players
English Football League players